Chevillon is the name or part of the name of the following communes in France:

Chevillon, Haute-Marne, in the Haute-Marne department
Chevillon, Yonne, in the Yonne department
Chevillon-sur-Huillard, in the Loiret department